S Rajendran  (1 June 1956 – 23 February 2019) was an Indian politician and Member of Parliament elected from Tamil Nadu. He was elected to the Lok Sabha from Viluppuram constituency as an Anna Dravida Munnetra Kazhagam candidate in 2014 election.

He died in a road accident at Tindivanam in which his driver lost control of his car and crashed into the road median.

References 

|-

All India Anna Dravida Munnetra Kazhagam politicians
India MPs 2014–2019
Lok Sabha members from Tamil Nadu
1956 births
2019 deaths
People from Viluppuram district
Accidental deaths in India